The 2014–15 Oman Professional League (known as the Omantel Professional League for sponsorship reasons) was the 39th edition of the top football league in Oman. The season began on 11 September 2014, and concluded on 28 May 2015. Al-Nahda Club were the defending champions, having won their third title in the previous 2013–14 season. On Saturday, 9 May 2015, Al-Oruba SC were crowned the champions of the 2014–15 Oman Professional League with three games to spare after Sur SC was held to a 2–2 draw by Al-Suwaiq Club at the Al-Seeb Stadium. Al-Oruba who had beaten Sohar SC, 1–0 on Friday took their tally to 48 points from 23 matches, gaining an unassailable lead of eight points ahead of second-placed Sur. Sur, which needed to win on Saturday to keep their title hopes alive, and settled for one point to take its tally to 40 points, helping the fierce rivals from Sur city to win their 4th domestic title.

Teams
This season the league has 14 teams. Majees SC and Al-Ittihad Club were relegated to the First Division League after finishing in the relegation zone in the 2013–14 season. Al-Nasr S.C.S.C. however again managed to play in the top division as they won the Relegation/Promotion playoff against Al-Mudhaibi Club. The two relegated teams were replaced by First Division League winners Al-Khabourah SC, runners-up Bowsher Club.

The winner and the runner-up will qualify for the 2016 AFC Cup.

Stadiums and locations

Note: Table lists clubs in alphabetical order.

Personnel and kits

Note: Flags indicate national team as has been defined under FIFA eligibility rules. Players may hold more than one non-FIFA nationality.

Managerial changes

Foreign players
Restricting the number of foreign players strictly to four per team, including a slot for a player from AFC countries. A team could use four foreign players on the field during each game including at least one player from the AFC country.

League table

Results

Clubs season-progress

Promotion/relegation play-off

1st leg

2nd leg

Sohar secured promotion after winning 2–1 on aggregate

Season statistics

Top scorers

* Player scored 2 goals for Saham SC** Player scored 2 goals for Dhofar S.C.S.C.

Top Omani scorers

Hat-tricks

OFA Awards
Oman Football Association awarded the following awards for the 2014–15 Oman Professional League season.
Top Scorer: Mechac Koffi (Al-Nasr)
Best Player: Eid Al-Farsi (Al-Oruba)
Most Promising Young Player: Mohammed Al-Najashi (Sur)
Best Goalkeeper: Riyadh Al-Alawi (Al-Oruba)
Best Coach: Philippe Burle (Al-Oruba)
Best Team Manager: Hussain Mustahil (Al-Nasr)
Fair Play Award: Al-Suwaiq

Media coverage

Controversies
The league was the subject of controversies like the refusal of Omani referees to officiate in the league matches and boycott of the Professional League by clubs.

Before the beginning of the 2014–15 season, nine top clubs of the Oman Professional League demanded the cancellation of the Professional League. It was reported that the presidents of the nine clubs (Al-Oruba, Dhofar, Al-Seeb, Al-Nahda, Fanja, Bowsher, Sohar, Al-Shabab and Sur) held a meeting in the head office of Sur SC on 7 June 2014 in order to discuss the experience of different clubs of the professional league. The statement released by the clubs after this meeting sparked a wave of controversy as all these nine clubs decided to hold a meeting with Sayyid Khalid Al-Busaidi, Chairman of the Oman Football Association and demand the cancellation of the 2014–15 season of the Oman Professional League. The reason given out was that the clubs were unable to meet the financial demands laid out by the association and also that the association failed to fulfill the promises made before the beginning of the pro-league system.

In a major embarrassment for the Oman Football Association (OFA), all its top-division referees boycotted the three-day opening round of the prestigious Omantel Professional League (OPL), which began on 11 September 2014, over a payment issue. This was the first ever instance in Oman of OFA-accredited referees boycotting top-flight domestic league matches over a stand-off. The referees refused to officiate in the opening-round matches on 11 September 2014, 12 September 2014 and 13 September 2014 over long-standing bonus payments from the OFA. The row over pending bonus payments for the referees had been brewing since the conclusion of the inaugural edition of OPL last season. The first round match between Sur SC and Al-Seeb Club was postponed from the scheduled time to another time and the match between Dhofar S.C.S.C. and Al-Khaboora SC which was also scheduled to be held on 11 September was postponed to the next day because of the refusal of Omani referees to officiate in the league matches. The OFA, under the chairmanship of Sayyid Khalid al Busaidy, managed to defuse the crisis by requesting the UAE football body to send match officials to get the OPL started. UAE duly responded, sending 16 officials - eight referees and eight linesmen - who officiated in the seven opening-round matches that went ahead as scheduled from Thursday to Saturday at various venues in Oman.

On 11 December 2014, defending champions Al-Nahda failed to turn up against Dhofar in an OPL match at the Al-Saada Stadium in Salalah; the Oman Professional League's Disciplinary Committee handed the result of the abandoned match in favour of Dhofar (3-0) and docked Al-Nahda a total of nine points - three for skipping the 11 December fixture and six more as penalty.

On 11 February 2015, 4 (Al-Musannah, Al-Seeb, Bowsher and Fanja) out of the 14 clubs participating in the 2014–15 Oman Professional League along with 8 other Omani clubs decided to go ahead with their demand for an Extraordinary General Meeting (EGM) with the aim of introducing a no-confidence motion against the association's  board members.

On 7 March 2015, 10 out of 39 clubs attending a consultative meeting of the OFA walked out in protest midway into the proceedings. walkout was triggered by the OFA's decision to call off an Extraordinary General Meeting (EGM), which was originally scheduled for 7 March 2015. However, the OFA which had previously agreed for an EGM, on 6 March 2015 shelved the summit, citing a letter from the FIFA, football's world governing body. On the very next day, the OFA cancelled the membership of 11 clubs (Ahli Sidab, Al-Ittifaq, Al-Kamel Wa Al-Wafi, Al-Musannah, Al-Seeb, Bowsher, Dhofar, Fanja, Ibri, Ja'lan and Nizwa) for illegally withdrawing from the consultative meeting conducted by the OFA.

See also

2014–15 Sultan Qaboos Cup
2014–15 Oman Professional League Cup
2014 Oman Super Cup
2014–15 Oman First Division League
2015–16 Oman Second Division League

References

Top level Omani football league seasons
1
Oman